Leslie George Snow (1907-1995) was an English athlete.

Athletics
He competed in the javelin at the 1930 British Empire Games for England.

Personal life
He was a bank clerk at the time of the 1930 Games and lived in Horley, Surrey.

References

1907 births
1995 deaths
English male javelin throwers
Athletes (track and field) at the 1930 British Empire Games
Commonwealth Games competitors for England